Homework is an album of previously unreleased demos by John Du Cann, with drum programming by Paul Hammond. It is considered Atomic Rooster's eighth and final studio album.

In 1981, the recently reformed Atomic Rooster signed to Polydor Records to release two singles, with the option of an album to follow, should the singles prove successful. Although the singles, "Play It Again" (1981) and  "End Of The Day" (1982), performed well in rock clubs and on specialist rock charts, they failed to make an impression on the national charts. Consequently, Polydor dropped the band. Shortly afterwards, owing to resurfacing internal tensions, Du Cann left Atomic Rooster for the second and final time.

Du Cann's demos, recorded between 1979 and 1981 for the projected album, were never completed and remained unreleased for several decades. In 2008, Du Cann licensed them for release by Angel Air Records, under the Atomic Rooster moniker. The album was rounded out by the inclusion of the six A and B-sides of the two Polydor singles. The two Polydor singles, issued on both 7" and 12", featured Gillan bassist John McCoy.

The CD was compiled and annotated by Record Collector's Joe Geesin, and featured quotes from John Du Cann.

Track listing
All songs written by Du Cann except where noted.

"The Dukes Theme" 3:24
"Make Me Strong" 2:50
"The Devil in Me" 4:13
"Fool" 3:13
"It Can Wait Another Day" 2:48
"C.O.D" 3:08
"Mind Over Matter" 3:29
"A Matter of Time" 3:18
"Cut the Wire" 6:31
"X-MASS" 2:00
"Open up the Sky" 3:22
"City Boy" 2:49
"The Band Played On" 2:20
"Different Words" 2:31
"Leopard's Skin" 2:32
"The Buck Stops Here" 1:42
"Somebody's Looking After You?" 4:31
"Play it Again" (Du Cann/Crane) 3:12 - single A-side (1981)
"Rebel with a Clause" aka "Start to Live" 2:58 - single B-side
"Devil's Answer" 4:11 - live in Milan 1981; 12" B-side
"End of the Day" 3:28 - single A-side (1982)
"Night Living" aka "Living Underground" 3:39 - single B-side
"Tomorrow Night" (Crane) 4:51 - live studio version 1981; 12" B-side

Tracks 18-20, 22 and 23 were with Vincent Crane.

Atomic Rooster compilation albums
2008 compilation albums